The Latin Grammy Award for Best Latin Jazz/Jazz Album is an honor presented annually at the Latin Grammy Awards, a ceremony that recognizes excellence and creates a wider awareness of cultural diversity and contributions of Latin recording artists in the United States and internationally. The award has been given to artists since the 1st Latin Grammy Awards in 2000 for vocal or instrumental albums containing more than half of its playing time of newly recorded material in Spanish or Portuguese. Latin jazz is a mixture of musical genres, including Afro-Caribbean and Pan-American rhythms with the harmonic structure of jazz. Other jazz genres may also be considered for inclusion by the Jazz Committee.

The award was first presented as a tie between Michel Camilo and Tomatito for Spain and Paquito D'Rivera for Tropicana Nights. D'Rivera holds the record for most wins as performer in this category, with six (including one awarded as the Paquito D'Rivera Quintet) out of eight nominations. Bebo Valdés won the award twice for albums which also earned the Grammy Award: Bebo de Cuba received the Best Traditional Tropical Latin Album accolade in 2005, while Juntos Para Siempre, by Bebo and Chucho Valdés won for Latin Jazz Album in 2010. Chucho Valdés has won the award four times while Bebo, Camilo, Gonzalo Rubalcaba, and Arturo Sandoval have been awarded twice. In 2012, the award was given to Sandoval for the album Dear Diz (Every Day I Think of You), which was also nominated for Album of the Year. Since its inception, the award has been presented to musicians or ensembles originating from Brazil, Cuba, Dominican Republic, United States, and Spain.

Winners and nominees

2000s

2010s

2020s

 Each year is linked to the article about the Latin Grammy Awards held that year.
 The name of the performer and the nominated album.

See also

Billboard Latin Music Award for Latin Jazz Album of the Year
Grammy Award for Best Latin Jazz Album

References
General

Specific

External links
Official site of the Latin Grammy Awards

Awards established in 2000

Latin Jazz Album